Michael Snaer (born June 21, 1990) is an American former professional basketball player who last played for Karpoš Sokoli in Macedonia. As a college player, he led Florida State University to their first ACC tournament championship in 2012, earning Most Valuable Player honors.

High school career
Snaer, a 6'5" shooting guard from Moreno Valley, California, attended Rancho Verde High School. As a senior, he averaged 28.1 points, 10.8 rebounds, 5.2 assists, 3.6 steals and 2.2 blocks per game.  He was named a McDonald's All-American and named Gatorade player of the year for California.

Considered a five-star recruit by Rivals.com, Snaer was listed as the No. 2 shooting guard and the No. 7 player in the nation in 2009. He chose to attend Florida State over offers from UCLA, Missouri, Marquette and Kansas.

College career
As a freshman, Snaer averaged 8.8 points per game, third on the team and made the conference All-Freshman team.  In his sophomore season, Snaer moved into the starting lineup full-time. He again averaged 8.8 points per game and helped lead the Seminoles to the 2011 NCAA tournament, where the team made their first Sweet 16 since 1993.

In his junior season, Snaer emerged as one of the top players in the Atlantic Coast Conference.  He averaged 14.0 points per game (to lead the team) and led the Seminoles to their first ACC tournament championship.  He also unofficially led the country in buzzer beaters as he hit three pointers to clinch victories over Duke and Virginia Tech during the season.  Snaer averaged 18 points per game in the 2012 ACC tournament and was named tournament MVP.  For the regular season, Snaer was named second team All-ACC and was chosen as a member of the conference All-Defensive team.  In the NCAA tournament, Snaer struggled and was held scoreless for the first time all season against St. Bonaventure in the first round.  The Seminoles lost in the second round to Cincinnati.

Snaer opted to return to Florida State for his senior season, where he was considered a likely candidate for ACC Player of the Year and All-American honors.

College statistics

Professional career
Snaer went undrafted in the 2013 NBA draft.  Following summer league stints with the Oklahoma City Thunder and Los Angeles Lakers and rejecting an invite to join the Brooklyn Nets camp, Snaer signed with Enel Brindisi of Italy's top league. In 2013, he signed with Russian team Ural Yekaterinburg. On December 2, 2014, he left Ural.

On October 30, 2016, he was acquired by the Los Angeles D-Fenders of the NBA Development League, but was waived on November 10.

References

External links 
Florida State Seminoles bio

1990 births
Living people
21st-century African-American sportspeople
African-American basketball players
American expatriate basketball people in Italy
American expatriate basketball people in Russia
American expatriate basketball people in North Macedonia
American men's basketball players
Basketball players from California
Florida State Seminoles men's basketball players
McDonald's High School All-Americans
New Basket Brindisi players
People from Moreno Valley, California
Shooting guards